Polar Sun Spire is a peak in Beluga Mountain in the Sam Ford Fjord of Baffin Island, Canada. The first ascent was made in 1996 by Mark Synnott, Jeff Chapman and Warren Hollinger. The team spent a full month on the climb and summited after 36 consecutive nights in a portaledge. They encountered difficulties up to A4 and named their 34-pitch route "The Great and Secret Show." A Norwegian team established another line in 2000.

References

External links
 Mark Synnott's Climbing Expeditions 1996 - Polar Sun Spire
Climbing Beluga on Baffin Island

Mountains of Baffin Island
One-thousanders of Nunavut